Bohuslav Rylich (5 May 1934 – July 2020) was a Czech basketball player. He competed in the men's tournament at the 1960 Summer Olympics.

References

External links
 

1934 births
2020 deaths
Czech men's basketball players
Olympic basketball players of Czechoslovakia
Basketball players at the 1960 Summer Olympics
People from Nymburk
Sportspeople from the Central Bohemian Region